Brigadier General Ohn Thwin (1970 — 24 September 2022) was a Burmese military officer and diplomat. After retiring from the army, he served as Myanmar’s ambassador to Sri Lanka, Bangladesh, Maldives and South Africa. He was a leading member of the Myanmar War Veterans Organization. He graduated from the 15th intake of the Defense Services Academy. It was said that he was the mentor of Vice Senior General Soe Win.

On 24 September 2022, he was shot dead, along with his son-in-law Ye Tayza, a former army captain, by anti-regime urban guerrilla fighters in Yangon, becoming the highest-ranking junta target killed by resistance groups. He was accused of supporting the junta and encouraging the military to kill people who were against the coup. The military council announced in October that it had arrested 10 individuals responsible for Ohn Thwin's death. The military council has condemned the assassination, calling it a deliberate killing of veterans

References 

1970 births
2022 deaths
Burmese generals
Burmese military personnel
Deaths by firearm in Myanmar
Defence Services Academy alumni
Burmese diplomats